The Greitspitz (also spelled Greitspitze) (2,871 m; also referenced as 2,872 m ) is a mountain of the Samnaun Alps, located on the border between Switzerland and Austria. It lies approximately halfway between Samnaun and Ischgl.

In winter it is part of the ski area Silvretta Arena.

References

External links
 Greitspitz on Hikr

Mountains of the Alps
Mountains of Graubünden
Mountains of Tyrol (state)
Austria–Switzerland border
International mountains of Europe
Mountains of Switzerland
Two-thousanders of Switzerland
Samnaun